DHS most often refers to the United States Department of Homeland Security.

DHS may also refer to:

Government agencies and programs
 Demographic and Health Surveys, international USAID program
 Department of Human Services, numerous government departments at national and subnational levels
 Los Angeles County Department of Health Services
 New York City Department of Homeless Services

Science and technology
 3-DHS (3-Dehydroshikimic acid), a chemical compound
 DNase I hypersensitive site, in genetics
 Dynamic hip screw, surgical implant
 Node 4 or Docking Hub System, International Space Station module

Schools
 Davis High School (disambiguation)
 Dartmouth High School (disambiguation)
 Deerfield High School (Illinois), a public high school in Deerfield, Illinois, United States
 Dollarway High School, a public high school in Pine Bluff, Arkansas, United States
 Dunman High School, a secondary school in Kallang, Singapore

Other uses
 Dame of the Order of the Holy Sepulchre, Catholic order of knighthood
 Decent Homes Standard, a technical standard in the United Kingdom
 Desert Hot Springs, California
 Digital Homicide Studios, a defunct video game developer
 Discount Home Shoppers' Club, an American company
 Dreamhack summer, e.g. DHS14 (2014), part of a computer festival in Sweden
 United Arab Emirates dirham currency (informal abbreviation Dhs; ISO 4217 code is AED)